Garswood United Association Football Club is an English football club based in Garswood, near St Helens, in the ceremonial county of Merseyside and traditional (historic) county of Lancashire.

History
The club was established in 1967. It joined Division Two of the Mid-Cheshire League in 1988. After winning the division in their second season, it was promoted to Division One. In 1995–96, Garswood United won Division One, and was promoted to Division Two of the North West Counties League. The club finished third in its first season in the NWCL and eighth in its second, but then left the league to return to the Mid-Cheshire League, which was renamed the Cheshire League in 2007. The team were the inaugural winners of the Cheshire League President's Cup in 1999/99. In 2019/20, the club was promoted to the Cheshire League's Premier Division.

Honours
Mid-Cheshire League
Division One champions 1995–96, 2013–14
Division Two champions 1987–88, 1997–98
Mid Cheshire League Division One League Cup
Winners 2005–06
Wigan Cup
Winners 2005–06, 2007–08, 2009–10, 2013-14
Mid Cheshire League Hospitality Club
Winners 2008–09
Mid Cheshire Fair Play Award
Winners 2009–10

References

External links
Official website

Football clubs in England
Football clubs in Merseyside
Association football clubs established in 1967
1967 establishments in England
Sport in the Metropolitan Borough of St Helens
Cheshire Association Football League
North West Counties Football League clubs